Agazi may refer to:

 Agʿazi, a region of the Aksumite Empire in Eastern Tigray and  Eritrea
 Agazi, the name of a military operation in Mekelle during the 1983–85 famine